Frederick Bettany (1860 – 9 June 1924) was an English footballer who played for Burslem Port Vale and Stoke.

Career
Bettany played for Burslem St. Paul's and Burslem before joining Stoke in 1885. He played in both FA Cup matches in the 1885–86 season as Stoke lost to Crewe Alexandra in a replay. He was released by Stoke at the end of the season. He played for Burslem Port Vale at right-half in a 1–1 home draw with Great Lever in a friendly match on 11 April 1885. He joined the club on a permanent basis in March 1886 and played regular football, helping them reach the FA Cup third round in 1887. He served as the club's secretary between July and November 1886, but was released as a player, most likely in 1888. He scored one goal in seventeen games over all competitions for the club.

Career statistics

References

1860 births
1924 deaths
Sportspeople from Burslem
English footballers
Association football midfielders
Stoke City F.C. players
Port Vale F.C. players